Cassacco is a comune (municipality) in the Province of Udine in the Italian region Friuli-Venezia Giulia, located about  northwest of Trieste and about  northwest of Udine.

The municipality of Cassacco contains the frazioni (subdivisions, mainly villages and hamlets) Conoglano, Martinazzo, Raspano, and Montegnacco.

Cassacco borders the following municipalities: Colloredo di Monte Albano, Magnano in Riviera, Tarcento, Treppo Grande, Tricesimo.

Demographic evolution

Twin towns
Cassacco is twinned with:

  Glanegg, Austria, since 1997

References

External links
 www.comune.cassacco.ud.it

Cities and towns in Friuli-Venezia Giulia